The Elmsford School District, officially known as the Elmsford Union Free School District, is a public school district that serves approximately 980 students in Elmsford, New York in Westchester County.

The Superintendent of Schools is Dr. Marc P. Baiocco. Dr. Baiocco became Superintendent in 2017, replacing Dr. Joseph L. Ricca. Dr. Baiocco is the former Principal of Alexander Hamilton Junior/Senior High School, where he has served for the past 8 years.

History

In 2017 the district had 900 students. Joseph Ricca, previously of the East Hanover School District, was superintendent until July 1, 2017 upon becoming superintendent of White Plains Public Schools. Marc Baiocco replaced him in that role.

Board of Education
The Elmsford Board of Education is legally responsible for establishing and overseeing the goals and objectives of the school district. The Board is composed of five members, who are residents of the school district, elected to three-year terms. The school board elections are held each May. Included in its general powers are the following: observing and enforcing federal and state education laws and local school board policies, appointing personnel upon the Superintendent's recommendation, appraising programs and services, and adopting the annual school budget. Regular meetings of the Board of Education are held on the first Wednesday of every month. The members of the Board of Education are:

President- Dennis Rambaran
Vice President- James B. Henson
Trustee- Yvette Eannazzo
Trustee- Marla Peers
Trustee- Candice Wood

District Administrators
Superintendent of Schools- Dr. Marc P. Baiocco
Assistant Superintendent for Finance and Operations- Ms. Gladys Pagan-Baxter
Director of Technology and Certified Staff- Mr. Jeffrey Olender
Director Pupil Personnel Services- Ms. Jo-Anne Dobbins

Schools
The Elmsford School District houses 3 schools across the district.

The Carl L. Dixson Primary School
The Carl L. Dixson Primary School has seen many changes since it was built, and now serves grades Pre- Kindergarten to 1st grade. The building opened in 1894 as the Hillside Avenue School.
Jeffrey J. Olender serves as Principal.

Alice E. Grady Elementary School
Alice E. Grady Elementary School houses grades 2nd through 6th. The building is named after lifelong village resident, Alice Grady.

The Principal of Alice E. Grady Elementary School is Dr.Andrea Hamilton

An addition was built to Alice E. Grady Elementary School, along with several renovations, in 2000. Included in the project were 4 classrooms, a new library, a new computer lab, an art room, a gazebo, a new gymnasium, and a renovated cafeteria and music room.

Alexander Hamilton Jr./Sr High School
Alexander Hamilton Jr./Sr. High School (AHHS) contains the district's 7th through 12th grade population. The building is named after the first United States Secretary of the Treasury, Alexander Hamilton.

The Principal is Joseph Englehart  and Ms. Maracallo  is the Assistant Principal.

References

School districts in New York (state)
Education in Westchester County, New York